The Sholaga (Soliga) language is a Dravidian language related to Kannada and Tamil, spoken by the Soliga people.

Other names 
Sholaga language, is also known as Kadu Sholigar, Sholiga, Sholigar, Solaga, Soliga, Soligar, Solanayakkans, Sholanayika.

Classification 
Sholaga is classified as a Dravidian language, more specifically South Dravidian. Dravidian languages are split into five main categories by the name of Southern, South Central, Central, North and Unclassified. Sholaga falls into the Southern category which is then split into the three categories: Tamil-Kannada, Macro-Tulu, and unclassified. Sholaga falls into the Tamil-Kannada category.

Words

References

External links 
OLAC resources
Si, A. (2011). ScholarSpace at University of Hawaii at Manoa: Documenting traditional biological and ecological knowledge: An Indian example

Tamil languages